Dongguan University of Technology (DGUT; 东莞理工学院) is a college in Dongguan, Guangdong, China.

History 
 Planned 1990
 Formed 1992
 First undergraduates 2002
 First graduates 2006

Academic 
It has two campuses: Songshan Lake Campus (often considered the Oxford of Guangdong), and the Guancheng Campus in the Guancheng Subdistrict.

DGUT has six schools: 
 Electronic Science and Technology
 Chemical Engineering and Technology
 Computer Science and Technology
 Mechanical Engineering
 Chinese Language and Literature
 Business Management

Electronic Science and Technology, and Chemical Engineering and Technology are authorized as the disciplines of the newly conferred Masters-degree units in DGUT.

Dongguan University of Technology has the physicist Yang Chen-Ning as its Honorary President.

References

External links
 Dongguan University Of Technology
 Dongguan University Of Technology 

Universities and colleges in Dongguan